Agent 009 is a 1980 Indian Hindi-language film produced by S.V.S.Films, starring Vijendra Mittal, Rehana Sultan, Madhushala and Padma Khanna.

Cast

 Vijendra Mittal
 Rehana Sultan
 Madhushala
 Padma Khanna

Soundtrack

References

External links

1980s Hindi-language films
1980 films
Films scored by Sonik-Omi
Indian spy action films